Zangentulus is a genus of proturans in the family Acerentomidae.

Species
 Zangentulus sinensis Yin, 1983

References

Protura